Microsoft Paint is a simple raster graphics editor that has been included with all versions of Microsoft Windows. The program opens, modifies and saves image files in Windows bitmap (BMP), JPEG, GIF, PNG, and single-page TIFF formats. The program can be in color mode or two-color black-and-white, but there is no grayscale mode. For its simplicity and wide availability, it rapidly became one of the most used Windows applications, introducing many to painting on a computer for the first time. It is still widely used for simple image manipulation tasks.

In July 2017, Microsoft added Paint to the list of deprecated features of Windows 10 and announced that it would become a free standalone application in Microsoft Store. Microsoft had envisioned Paint 3D as a replacement. However, Paint continued to be included with Windows 10. Microsoft eventually reversed course and announced an updated version of Paint in Windows 11. Instead, Microsoft deprecated Paint 3D.

History 
The first version of Paint was programmed by Dan McCabe and introduced with the first version of Windows, Windows 1.0, in November 1985 as a competitor to Macintosh's MacPaint. It was a licensed version of ZSoft Corporation's PC Paintbrush that shipped with 24 tools and can read and write files only in the proprietary "MSP" format drawn in monochrome graphics. Aside from "pencil" and "shape" tools and a brush that draws in 24 "brush shapes and patterns", the toolset also contained two features unique for the time: one the ability to draw Bézier curves and the other that forces lines to be drawn on three angles to create an isometric three-quarter perspective. This version was later superseded by Paintbrush in Windows 3.0, with a redesigned user interface, true color support, and support for the BMP and PCX file formats. Microsoft had deprecated the MSP format, and Paintbrush could only read MSP files.

Microsoft shipped an updated version of Paint with Windows 95 and Windows NT 4.0, which allows saving and loading a custom set of color wells as color palette (.pal) files. This functionality only works correctly if the color depth of images is 16-bits per pixel (bpp) or higher. Later versions of Paint do not support this feature.

In Windows 95–98, Windows 2000 and Windows Me, Paint can open JPEG, GIF and 48-bit (16-bpp) TIF images and save images in JPEG and GIF formats when appropriate graphics filters are installed. Such plug-ins are included with Microsoft Office and Microsoft PhotoDraw. This also allows Paint to use transparent backgrounds. Support for PCX files was dropped. Starting with Windows Me, the canvas size expands automatically when larger images are opened or pasted, instead of asking.

In Windows XP and later, Paint uses GDI+ and therefore can natively save images as BMP, JPEG, GIF, TIFF and PNG without requiring additional graphics filters.

In Windows Vista, the toolbar icons and default color palette were changed. Paint in Windows Vista can undo a change up to 10 times, compared to 3 in previous versions; it also includes a slider for image magnification and a crop function. This version saves in JPEG format by default.

Windows 7 and 8.x 

The version of Paint in Windows 7 and later features a ribbon in its user interface. It also features "artistic" brushes composed of varying shades of gray and some degree of transparency that give a more realistic result. To add to the realism, the oil and watercolor brushes can only paint for a small distance before the user must re-click (this gives the illusion that the paintbrush has run out of paint). In addition, Paint can now undo up to 50 subsequent changes. It also has anti-aliased shapes, which can be resized freely until they are rasterized when another tool is selected. This version supports viewing (but not saving) transparent PNG and ICO file formats and saves files in the .png file format by default.

Text can now be pasted into text boxes that don't have enough room to display the text. A text box can then be enlarged or reshaped appropriately to fit the text if desired. Previous versions of Paint would display an error message if a user tried to paste more text than there was room for.

The Windows 8 version of Paint mostly corrects a long-standing defect from previous versions involving the inability to scroll the window when editing in Zoom view over 100%. However, when inserting text in Zoom view, the user cannot move the text beyond the zoomed viewport while the text window is in edit mode with either the mouse or keyboard.

Windows 10 
In the April 2017 "Creators Update" for Windows 10, Microsoft released Paint 3D alongside Paint. In addition to the traditional two-dimensional drawing tools, Paint 3D can import and manipulate three-dimensional models. Three months later, on July 23, 2017, Microsoft added Paint to the list of deprecated Windows features. The next day, in the wake of "an incredible outpouring of support and nostalgia", Microsoft clarified that Paint would become a free app on Microsoft Store, even though Paint 3D offers the same functionality.

Paint, however, remained a part of all versions of Windows 10. The closest Microsoft ever got to enacting said decision was adding a removal notice to Paint's user interface in Windows 10 versions 1803 and 1809.

In March 2021, with the release of Windows 10 Insider build 21332 to the Dev Channel, Microsoft removed Paint 3D from clean installations of the build, in addition to the 3D Objects app.

In April 2021, Microsoft released Windows 10 Insider build 21354, which made Paint (along with Snipping Tool) updatable from the Microsoft Store. It had also been moved from the Windows Accessories folder of the Start menu to its own section.

Windows 11 
In August 2021, Microsoft teased an updated version of Paint for Windows 11, featuring a refreshed UI, improved font picker, and a dark theme.

Features 
Paint has a few functions not mentioned in the help file: a stamp mode, trail mode, regular shapes, and moving pictures. For the stamp mode, the user can select a part of the image, hold the  key, and move it to another part of the canvas. This, instead of cutting the piece out, creates a copy of it. The process can be repeated as many times as desired, as long as the  key is held down. The trail mode works exactly the same, but it uses the  instead of the  key.

The user may also draw straight horizontal, vertical, or diagonal lines with the pencil tool, without the need of the straight line tool, by holding the  key and dragging the tool. To crop whitespace or eliminate parts of a graphic, the blue handle in the lower right corner can be dragged to increase canvas size or crop a graphic. Users can also draw perfect shapes (which have a width equal to the height) using any shape tool by holding down the  while dragging.

Older versions of Paint, such as the one bundled with Windows 3.1, feature a color-replace brush, which replaced a single color underneath the brush with another without affecting the rest of the image. In later versions of Paint, the color erase brush may be simulated by selecting the color to be replaced as the primary color, and the one it is replaced with as the secondary color, and then right-click dragging the erase tool.

Support for indexed palettes 
By default, almost all versions of Paint are generally unable to properly downgrade created images to indexed palettes using fewer than 24 bits per pixel. When saving an image in a format that uses indexed palettes with fewer than 24 bits per pixel, a warning message appears about the loss of quality. Paint does not utilize binary, color or grayscale dithering or palette optimization, and the image will be saved with usually irreversibly scrambled colors.

Paint is nonetheless able to correctly load and save indexed palettes in any of the supported formats if an image is opened as an 8-bit or otherwise indexed palette image. In that case, the image's palette is preserved when saving. However, there is no way to see the actual palette; color choices for brushes, text, and erasers as well as user-defined colors will be limited to the closest available color in the indexed palette.

See also 

Bundled Paint equivalents on other OSes
 Deluxe Paint, for Amiga
 KolourPaint, for KDE
 MacPaint, for Macintosh
 Pinta, for GNOME 
 Pocket Paint, for Windows CE
 PaintZ, for ChromeOS
 Paint MS Version for Android

Misc.
 Comparison of raster graphics editors
 Microsoft Fresh Paint
 GIMP
 Pixel art, a form of digital art

References 

1985 software
Raster graphics editors
Windows components